Carex interrupta is a tussock-forming species of perennial sedge in the family Cyperaceae. It is native to south eastern parts of Canada and north eastern parts of the United States.

Description
The sedges tend not to spread forming a turf. The leaves have red brown coloured sheaths around the base. It fruits between July and August.

Taxonomy
The species was first formally described by the botanist Johann Otto Boeckeler in 1876 as a part of the work Linnaea. It has three synonyms;
Carex angustata var. verticillata Boott 
Carex interrupta var. distenta Kük. 
Carex verticillata Boott.

Distribution
The plant is usually found growing in sandy soils along rivers and in wet meadows in temperate biomes with a range that extends from British Columbia in the north down to Oregon in the south.

See also
List of Carex species

References

interrupta
Taxa named by Johann Otto Boeckeler
Plants described in 1876
Flora of British Columbia
Flora of Oregon
Flora of Washington (state)